Messier 69 or M69, also known NGC 6637, is a globular cluster in the southern constellation of Sagittarius. It can be found 2.5° to the northeast of the star Epsilon Sagittarii and is dimly visible in 50 mm aperture binoculars. The cluster was discovered by Charles Messier on August 31, 1780, the same night he discovered M70. At the time, he was searching for an object described by Nicolas-Louis de Lacaille in 1751–2 and thought he had rediscovered it, but it is unclear if Lacaille actually described M69.

It is a relatively metal-rich globular cluster that is a likely member of the galactic bulge population. Its center has a bright luminosity density of ·pc−3 (meaning per cubic parsec). It is a close neighbor of its analog M70 – possibly only 1,800 light-years separates the two.

Gallery

See also
 List of Messier objects

References and footnotes

External links

 Messier 69, Galactic Globular Clusters Database page
 

Globular clusters
Sagittarius (constellation)
069
NGC objects
Astronomical objects discovered in 1780